The CDC Classification System for HIV Infection is the medical classification system used by the United States  Centers for Disease Control and Prevention (CDC) to classify HIV disease and infection. The system is used to allow the government to handle epidemic statistics and define who receives US government assistance.

In adults and adolescents
This classification system is how the United States agency, the Centers for Disease Control and Prevention (CDC) classifies HIV disease and infection. This is to allow the government to handle epidemic statistics and define who receives US government assistance. In 1993, the CDC added pulmonary tuberculosis, recurrent pneumonia, and invasive cervical cancer to the list of clinical conditions in the AIDS surveillance case definition published in 1987 and expanded the AIDS surveillance case definition to include all HIV-infected persons with CD4+ T-lymphocyte counts of less than 200 cells/uL or a CD4+ percentage of less than 14. Considerable variation exists in the relative risk of death following different AIDS defining clinical conditions.

According to the US CDC definition, one has AIDS if he/she is infected with HIV and present with one of the following:
 A CD4+ T-cell count below 200 cells/μl (or a CD4+ T-cell percentage of total lymphocytes of less than 14%)
OR
 he/she has one of the following defining illnesses:
 Candidiasis of bronchi, trachea, or lungs
 Candidiasis esophageal
 Cervical cancer (invasive)
 Coccidioidomycosis, disseminated or extrapulmonary
 Cryptococcosis, extrapulmonary
 Cryptosporidiosis, chronic intestinal for longer than 1 month
 Cytomegalovirus disease (other than liver, spleen or lymph nodes)
 Encephalopathy (HIV-related)
 Herpes simplex: chronic  (for more than 1 month); or bronchitis, pneumonitis, or esophagitis
 Histoplasmosis, disseminated or extrapulmonary
 Isosporiasis, chronic intestinal (for more than 1 month)
 Kaposi's sarcoma
 Lymphoma Burkitt's, immunoblastic or primary brain
 Mycobacterium avium complex
 Mycobacterium, other species, disseminated or extrapulmonary
 Pneumocystis carinii pneumonia
 Pneumonia (recurrent)
 Progressive multifocal leukoencephalopathy
 Salmonella sepsis (recurrent)
 Toxoplasmosis of the brain
 Tuberculosis
 Wasting syndrome due to HIV

People who are not infected with HIV may also develop these conditions; this does not mean they have AIDS. However, when an individual presents laboratory evidence against HIV infection, a diagnosis of AIDS is ruled out unless the patient has:
 undergone high-dose corticoid therapy or other immunosuppressive/cytotoxic therapy in the three months before the onset of the indicator disease
 OR been diagnosed with Hodgkin's disease, non-Hodgkin's lymphoma, lymphocytic leukemia, multiple myeloma, or any cancer of lymphoreticular or histiocytic tissue, or angioimmunoblastic lymphoadenopathy
 OR a genetic immunodeficiency syndrome atypical of HIV infection, such as one involving hypogamma globulinemia

AND
 the individual has had Pneumocystis carinii pneumonia
 OR one of the above defining illnesses AND a CD4+ T-cell count below 200 cells/μl (or a CD4+ T-cell percentage of total lymphocytes of less than 14%).

In children
Due to the additional knowledge of the progression of HIV disease among children, a revised classification system for HIV infection in children was developed in 1994 that replaced the pediatric HIV classification system that was published in 1987. A child for the purposes of the CDC is an individual of less than 13 years of age. Standard anti-HIV IgG antibody tests cannot be used to reliably indicate a child's infection status before 18 months of age, so viral antigen tests are used.

In the new system, HIV-infected children are classified into mutually exclusive categories according to three parameters:

a) infection status

b) clinical status

c) immunologic status

This classification system reflects the stage of the child's disease, establishes mutually exclusive classification categories, and balances simplicity and medical accuracy in the classification process. This document also describes revised pediatric definitions for two acquired immunodeficiency syndrome-defining conditions.

When an infant is born to an HIV-infected mother, diagnosis of an HIV infection is complicated by the presence of maternal anti-HIV IgG antibody, which crosses the placenta to the fetus. Indeed, virtually all children born to HIV-infected mothers are HIV-antibody positive at birth, although only 15%-30% are actually infected.

Category N: Not symptomatic
Children who have no signs or symptoms considered to be the result of HIV
infection or who have only one of the conditions listed in Category A.

Category A: Mildly symptomatic
Children with two or more of the conditions listed below but none of the conditions listed in Categories B and C.
 Lymphadenopathy (>=0.5 cm at more than two sites; bilateral = one site)
 Hepatomegaly
 Splenomegaly
 Dermatitis
 Parotitis
 Recurrent or persistent upper respiratory infection, sinusitis, or otitis media

Category B: Moderately symptomatic
Children who have symptomatic conditions other than those listed for Category
A or C that are attributed to HIV infection. Examples of conditions in clinical
Category B include but are not limited to:
 Anemia (<8 g/dL), neutropenia (<1,000/mm³), or thrombocytopenia (<100,000/mm³) persisting for at least 30 days
 Bacterial meningitis, pneumonia, or sepsis (single episode)
 Candidiasis, oropharyngeal (thrush), persisting for more than 2 months in children over 6 months of age
 Cardiomyopathy
 Cytomegalovirus infection, with onset before 1 month of age
 Diarrhea, recurrent or chronic
 Hepatitis
 Herpes simplex virus (HSV) stomatitis, recurrent (more than two episodes within 1 year)
 HSV bronchitis, pneumonitis, or esophagitis with onset before 1 month of age
 Herpes zoster (shingles) involving at least two distinct episodes or more than one dermatome
 Leiomyosarcoma
 Lymphoid interstitial pneumonia (LIP) or pulmonary lymphoid hyperplasia complex
 Nephropathy
 Nocardiosis
 Persistent fever (lasting more than 1 month)
 Toxoplasmosis, onset before 1 month of age
 Varicella, disseminated (complicated chickenpox)

Category C: Severely symptomatic
 Serious bacterial infections, multiple or recurrent (i.e., any combination of at least two culture-confirmed infections within a 2-year period), of the following types: sepsis, pneumonia, meningitis, bone or joint infection, or abscess of an internal organ or body cavity (excluding otitis media, superficial skin or mucosal abscesses, and indwelling catheter-related infections)
 Candidiasis, esophageal or pulmonary (bronchi, trachea, lungs)
 Coccidioidomycosis, disseminated (at site other than or in addition to lungs or cervical or hilar lymph nodes)
 Cryptococcosis, extrapulmonary
 Cryptosporidiosis or isosporiasis with diarrhea persisting more than 1 month
 Cytomegalovirus disease with onset of symptoms at age over 1 month (at a site other than liver, spleen, or lymph nodes)
 Encephalopathy (at least one of the following progressive findings present for at least 2 months in the absence of a concurrent illness other than HIV infection that could explain the findings): a) failure to attain or loss of developmental milestones or loss of intellectual ability, verified by standard developmental scale or neuropsychological tests; b) impaired brain growth or acquired microcephaly demonstrated by head circumference measurements or brain atrophy demonstrated by computerized tomography or magnetic resonance imaging (serial imaging is required for children under 2 years of age); c) acquired symmetric motor deficit manifested by two or more of the following: paresis, pathologic reflexes, ataxia, or gait disturbance
 Herpes simplex virus infection causing a mucocutaneous ulcer that persists for more than 1 month; or bronchitis, pneumonitis, or esophagitis for any duration affecting a child over 1 month of age
 Histoplasmosis, disseminated (at a site other than or in addition to lungs or cervical or hilar lymph nodes)
 Kaposi's sarcoma
 Lymphoma, primary, in brain
 Lymphoma, small, noncleaved cell (Burkitt's), or immunoblastic or large cell lymphoma of B-cellor unknown immunologic phenotype
 Mycobacterium tuberculosis, disseminated or extrapulmonary
 Mycobacterium, other species or unidentified species, disseminated (at a site other than or in addition to lungs, skin, or cervical or hilar lymph nodes)
 Mycobacterium avium complex or Mycobacterium kansasii, disseminated (at site other than or in addition to lungs, skin, or cervical or hilar lymph nodes)
 Pneumocystis carinii pneumonia
 Progressive multifocal leukoencephalopathy
 Salmonella (nontyphoid) sepsis, recurrent
 Toxoplasmosis of the brain with onset at greater than 1 month of age
 Wasting syndrome in the absence of a concurrent illness other than HIV infection that could explain the following findings: a) persistent weight loss more than 10% of baseline OR b) downward crossing of at least two of the following percentile lines on the weight-for-age chart (e.g., 95th, 75th, 50th, 25th, 5th) in a child at least 1 year of age OR c) less than the 5th percentile on weight-for-height chart on two consecutive measurements at least 30 days apart PLUS a) chronic diarrhea (i.e., at least two loose stools per day for more than 30 days) OR b) documented fever (for at least 30 days, intermittent or constant)

Notes

References

 
 
 AIDS info
 
 AIDS.gov – The U.S. Federal Domestic HIV/AIDS Resource
 HIVtest.org – Find an HIV testing site near you

HIV/AIDS